The National Development Party (NDP) was a conservative political party in Montserrat led by Bertrand Osborne.

History
The NDP was established in December 1984, and launched a newspaper, the Montserrat Reporter the following year. In the 1987 general elections it won two seats in the Legislative Council. In the 1991 elections the party retained both seats.

By the 1996 elections Osborne was leader of the new Movement for National Reconstruction.

References

Defunct political parties in Montserrat
Political parties established in 1984
1984 establishments in Montserrat